Xerothamnella is a genus of flowering plants in the family Acanthaceae, native to Queensland, Australia. A molecular study shows that it is nested within Peristrophe.

Species
Currently accepted species include:

Xerothamnella herbacea R.M.Barker
Xerothamnella parvifolia C.T.White

References

 
Acanthaceae genera
Taxa named by Cyril Tenison White